Simdega subdivision is an administrative subdivision of the Simdega district in the South Chotanagpur division in the state of Jharkhand, India.

History 
Simdega subdivision was established in 1915 and was one of the four subdivisions of Ranchi district. In 1983, it became a part of the Gumla district when the latter was formed and in 2001, it became a part of the Simdega district when the latter was formed.

Overview 
Simdega district has only one subdivision – Simdega subdivision. There are 10 blocks in Simedga subdivision – Bano, Bansjore, Bolba, Jaldega, Koldega, Kolebira, Kurdeg, Pakartanr, Simdega and Thethaitangar.

Simdega subdivision covers 3774.00 km2 and has a population of 599,578 in 2011. The subdivision has 450 villages (449 inhabited and 1 uninhabited), and 1 statutory town. Over 90% of the population lives in the rural areas.

Geography

Police stations 
Police stations in Simdega subdivision are: 
Simdega 
Muffasil 
SC/ST 
Mahila 
Thethaitangar 
Kurdeg 
Bolba 
Kolebira 
Bano 
Jaldega 
Kersai 
Pakartanr 
 Rengarih 
Mahabuang 
AHTU

Blocks  
Community development blocks in the Simdega subdivision are:

Education   
In 2011, in Simdega subdivision out of a total 449 inhabited villages in 10 CD blocks there were 117 villages with pre-primary schools, 417 villages with primary schools, 243 villages with middle schools, 65 villages with secondary schools, 13 villages with senior secondary schools, 1 village with general degree college, 2 villages with vocation training schools/ ITI, 6 villages with non-formal training centres, 26 villages with no educational facility.

The only nagar panchayat had 10 primary schools, 18 middle schools, 5 secondary schools, 5 senior secondary schools, 1 general degree college, 2 recognised shorthand, typewriting, and vocational training institutions and 1 non-formal education centre (Sarba Shiksha Abhiyan).  
.*Senior secondary schools are also known as Inter colleges in Jharkhand.

Educational institutions   
The following institutions are located in Simdega subdivision: 
Simdega College was established at Simdega in 1960. 
St. Xavier's College, Simdega was established at Simdega in 2016. 
S.K.Bage College was established in 1985 at Kolebira.

(Information about degree colleges with proper reference may be added here)

Healthcare   
In 2011, in Simdega subdivision, in the 10 CD blocks, there were 17 villages with primary health centres, 131 villages with primary health subcentres, 29 villages with maternity and child welfare centres, 18 villages with allopathic hospitals, 23 villages with dispensaries, 2 villages with a veterinary hospitals, 26 villages with family welfare centres, 101 villages with medicine shops.

The only nagar panchayat had 1 hospital, 1 nursing home, 2 dispensaries, 1 maternity and child welfare centre, 1 veterinary hospital, 7 medicine shops.   
.*Private medical practitioners, alternative medicine etc. not included

Medical facilities
The major government medical facilities are: Referral Hospital at Thethaitangar and Community Health Centres (hospitals) at Bano, Bolba, Jaldega, Kolebira and Kurdeg.

(Anybody having referenced information about location of government/ private medical facilities may please add it here)

References   

   

Sub-divisions in Jharkhand